The Czarina's Secret is a 1928 MGM silent fictionalized film short in two-color Technicolor. It was the fourth film produced as part of Metro-Goldwyn-Mayer's "Great Events" series.

Production
The film was shot over five days at the Tec-Art Studio in Hollywood. The budget, slightly over $20,000, made it one of the more "higher priced productions" in the "Great Events" series. Cast members Sally Rand and Lucio Flamma had appeared in Technicolor sequences for Cecil B. deMille's The King of Kings less than a year earlier. As with the previous "Great Events" production, The Lady of Victories, The Czarina's Secret made extensive, experimental use of night scenes.

Release
The released version of The Czarina's Secret was well-reviewed, prompting Film Spectator to state that "Technicolor has brought its process to a point of perfection that our big producers can not ignore much longer," and surmising that audience demand for Technicolor would soon be on the increase.

Preservation status
The Czarina's Secret is considered a lost film.

References

External links 

1928 films
American silent short films
Metro-Goldwyn-Mayer short films
Silent films in color
1920s American films